The Raleigh mayoral election of 2005 was held on 11 October 2005 to elect a Mayor of Raleigh, North Carolina.  It was won by Democratic incumbent Charles Meeker, who defeated Republican J. H. Ross in the first-round primary.  Because Meeker won more than 50% in the first round, there was no need for a run-off.

Results

Footnotes

2005
Raleigh
2005 North Carolina elections